The City University of New York ( CUNY;) is the public university system of New York City. It is the largest urban university system in the United States, comprising 25 campuses: eleven senior colleges, seven community colleges, and seven professional institutions. While its constituent colleges date back as far as 1847, CUNY was established in 1961. The university enrolls more than 275,000 students and counts thirteen Nobel Prize winners and twenty-four MacArthur Fellows among its alumni.

History

Founding
In 1960, John R. Everett became the first chancellor of the Municipal College System of the City of New York, later renamed CUNY, for a salary of $25,000 ($ in current dollar terms). CUNY was created in 1961, by New York State legislation, signed into law by Governor Nelson Rockefeller. The legislation integrated existing institutions and a new graduate school into a coordinated system of higher education for the city, under the control of the "Board of Higher Education of the City of New York", which had been created by New York State legislation in 1926. By 1979, the Board of Higher Education had become the "Board of Trustees of the CUNY".

The institutions that were merged to create CUNY were:

 The Free Academy – Founded in 1847 by Townsend Harris, it was fashioned as "a Free Academy for the purpose of extending the benefits of education gratuitously to persons who have been pupils in the common schools of the city and county of New York." The Free Academy later became the City College of New York.
 The Female Normal and High School – Founded in 1870, and later renamed the Normal College. It would be renamed again in 1914 to Hunter College. During the early 20th century, Hunter College expanded into the Bronx, with what became Herbert Lehman College.
 Brooklyn College – Founded in 1930.
 Queens College – Founded in 1937.

Accessible education
CUNY has served a diverse student body, especially those excluded from or unable to afford private universities. Its four-year colleges offered a high-quality, tuition-free education to the poor, the working class, and the immigrants of New York City who met the grade requirements for matriculated status. During the post-World War I era, when some Ivy League universities, such as Yale University, discriminated against Jews, many Jewish academics and intellectuals studied and taught at CUNY. The City College of New York developed a reputation of being "the Harvard of the proletariat."

As New York City's population—and public college enrollment—grew during the early 20th century and the city struggled for resources, the municipal colleges slowly began adopting selective tuition, also known as instructional fees, for a handful of courses and programs. During the Great Depression, with funding for public colleges severely constrained, limits were imposed on the size of the colleges' free Day Sessions, and tuition was imposed upon students deemed "competent" but not academically qualified for the day program. Most of these "limited matriculation" students enrolled in the Evening Sessions, and paid tuition. Additionally, as the population of New York grew, CUNY was not able to accommodate the demand for higher education. Higher and higher requirements for admission were imposed; in 1965, a student seeking admission to CUNY needed an average of 92 or A−. This helped to ensure that the student population of CUNY remained largely white and middle-class.

Demand in the United States for higher education rapidly grew after World War II, and during the mid-1940s a movement began to create community colleges to provide accessible education and training. In New York City, however, the community college movement was constrained by many factors including "financial problems, narrow perceptions of responsibility, organizational weaknesses, adverse political factors, and other competing priorities."

Community colleges would have drawn from the same city coffers that were funding the senior colleges, and city higher education officials were of the view that the state should finance them. It was not until 1955, under a shared-funding arrangement with New York State, that New York City established its first community college, on Staten Island. Unlike the day college students attending the city's public baccalaureate colleges for free, community college students had to pay tuition fees under the state-city funding formula. Community college students paid tuition fees for approximately 10 years.

Over time, tuition fees for limited-matriculated students became an important source of system revenues. In fall 1957, for example, nearly 36,000 attended Hunter, Brooklyn, Queens and City Colleges for free, but another 24,000 paid tuition fees of up to $300 a year ($ in current dollar terms). Undergraduate tuition and other student fees in 1957 comprised 17 percent of the colleges' $46.8 million in revenues, about $7.74 million ($ in current dollar terms).

Three community colleges had been established by early 1961 when New York City's public colleges were codified by the state as a single university with a chancellor at the helm and an infusion of state funds. But the city's slowness in creating the community colleges as demand for college seats was intensifying and had resulted in mounting frustration, particularly on the part of minorities, that college opportunities were not available to them.

In 1964, as New York City's Board of Higher Education moved to take full responsibility for the community colleges, city officials extended the senior colleges' free tuition policy to them, a change that was included by Mayor Robert F. Wagner Jr. in his budget plans and took effect with the 1964–65 academic year.

Calls for greater access to public higher education from the black and Puerto Rican communities in New York, especially in Brooklyn, led to the founding of "Community College Number 7," later Medgar Evers College, in 1966–1967. In 1969, a group of black and Puerto Rican students occupied City College and demanded the racial integration of CUNY, which at the time had an overwhelmingly white student body.

Student protests
Students at some campuses became increasingly frustrated with the university's and Board of Higher Education's handling of university administration. At Baruch College in 1967, over a thousand students protested the plan to make the college an upper-division school limited to junior, senior, and graduate students. At Brooklyn College in 1968, students attempted a sit-in to demand the admission of more black and Puerto Rican students and additional black studies curriculum. Students at Hunter College also demanded a Black studies program. Members of the SEEK program, which provided academic support for underprepared and underprivileged students, staged a building takeover at Queens College in 1969 to protest the decisions of the program's director, who would later be replaced by a black professor. Puerto Rican students at Bronx Community College filed a report with the New York State Division of Human Rights in 1970, contending that the intellectual level of the college was inferior and discriminatory. Hunter College was crippled for several days by a protest of 2,000 students who had a list of demands focusing on more student representation in college administration. Across CUNY, students boycotted their campuses in 1970 to protest a rise in student fees and other issues, including the proposed (and later implemented) open admissions plan.

Like many college campuses in 1970, CUNY faced a number of protests and demonstrations after the Kent State massacre and Cambodian Campaign. The Administrative Council of the City University of New York sent U.S. president Richard Nixon a telegram in 1970 stating, "No nation can long endure the alienation of the best of its young people." Some colleges, including John Jay College of Criminal Justice, historically the "college for cops," held teach-ins in addition to student and faculty protests.

Open admissions
Under pressure from community activists and CUNY Chancellor Albert Bowker, the Board of Higher Education (BHE) approved an Open Admissions plan in 1966, but it was not scheduled to be fully implemented until 1975. However, in 1969, students and faculty across CUNY participated in rallies, student strikes, and class boycotts demanding an end to CUNY's restrictive admissions policies. CUNY administrators and Mayor John Lindsay expressed support for these demands, and the BHE voted to implement the plan immediately in the fall of 1970.

The doors to CUNY were opened wide to all those demanding entrance, assuring all high school graduates entrance to the university without having to fulfill traditional requirements such as exams or grades. This policy was known as open admissions and nearly doubled the number of students enrolling in the CUNY system to 35,000 (compared to 20,000 the year before). With greater numbers came more diversity: Black and Hispanic student enrollment increased threefold. Remedial education, to supplement the training of under-prepared students, became a significant part of CUNY's offerings.

Additionally, ethnic and Black Studies programs and centers were instituted on many CUNY campuses, contributing to the growth of similar programs nationwide.

However, retention of students in CUNY during this period was low, with two-thirds of students enrolled in the early 1970s leaving within four years without graduating. Robert Kibbee was chancellor of the City University of New York, the third-largest university in the United States, from 1971 to 1982.

Financial crisis of 1976
In fall 1976, during New York City's fiscal crisis, the free tuition policy was discontinued under pressure from the federal government, the financial community that had a role in rescuing the city from bankruptcy, and New York State, which would take over the funding of CUNY's senior colleges. Tuition, which had been in place in the State University of New York system since 1963, was instituted at all CUNY colleges.

Meanwhile, CUNY students were added to the state's need-based Tuition Assistance Program (TAP), which had been created to help private colleges. Full-time students who met the income eligibility criteria were permitted to receive TAP, ensuring for the first time that financial hardship would deprive no CUNY student of a college education. Within a few years, the federal government would create its own need-based program, known as Pell Grants, providing the neediest students with a tuition-free college education. Joseph S. Murphy was Chancellor of the City University of New York from 1982 to 1990, when he resigned. CUNY at the time was the third-largest university in the United States, with over 180,000 students.

By 2011, nearly six of ten full-time undergraduates qualified for a tuition-free education at CUNY due in large measure to state, federal and CUNY financial aid programs. CUNY's enrollment dipped after tuition was re-established, and there were further enrollment declines through the 1980s and into the 1990s.

Financial crisis of 1995
In 1995, CUNY suffered another fiscal crisis when Governor George Pataki proposed a drastic cut in state financing. Faculty cancelled classes and students staged protests. By May, CUNY adopted deep cuts to college budgets and class offerings. By June, to save money spent on remedial programs, CUNY adopted a stricter admissions policy for its senior colleges: students deemed unprepared for college would not be admitted, this a departure from the 1970 Open Admissions program. That year's final state budget cut funding by $102 million, which CUNY absorbed by increasing tuition by $750 and offering a retirement incentive plan for faculty.

In 1999, a task force appointed by Mayor Rudolph Giuliani issued a report that described CUNY as "an institution adrift" and called for an improved, more cohesive university structure and management, as well as more consistent academic standards. Following the report, Matthew Goldstein, a mathematician and City College graduate who had led CUNY's Baruch College and briefly, Adelphi University, was appointed chancellor. CUNY ended its policy of open admissions to its four-year colleges, raised its admissions standards at its most selective four-year colleges (Baruch, Brooklyn, City, Hunter and Queens), and required new enrollees who needed remediation, to begin their studies at a CUNY open-admissions community college.

2010 onwards
CUNY's enrollment of degree-credit students reached 220,727 in 2005 and 262,321 in 2010 as the university broadened its academic offerings. The university added more than 2,000 full-time faculty positions, opened new schools and programs, and expanded the university's fundraising efforts to help pay for them. Fundraising increased from $35 million in 2000 to more than $200 million in 2012.

As of Autumn 2013, all CUNY undergraduates are required to take an administration-dictated common core of courses which have been claimed to meet specific "learning outcomes" or standards. Since the courses are accepted university-wide, the administration claims it will be easier for students to transfer course credits between CUNY colleges. It also reduced the number of core courses some CUNY colleges had required, to a level below national norms, particularly in the sciences. The program is the target of several lawsuits by students and faculty, and was the subject of a "no confidence" vote by the faculty, who rejected it by an overwhelming 92% margin.

Chancellor Goldstein retired on July 1, 2013, and was replaced on June 1, 2014, by James Milliken, president of the University of Nebraska, and a graduate of the University of Nebraska and New York University School of Law. Milliken retired at the end of the 2018 academic year and moved on to become the chancellor for the University of Texas system.

In 2018, CUNY opened its 25th campus, the CUNY School of Labor and Urban Studies, named after former president Joseph S. Murphy and combining some forms and functions of the Murphy Institute that were housed at the CUNY School of Professional Studies.

On February 13, 2019, the Board of Trustees voted to appoint Queens College president Felix V. Matos Rodriguez as the chancellor of the City University of New York. Matos became both the first Latino and minority educator to head the university. He assumed the post May 1.

Enrollment and demographics
CUNY is the fourth-largest university system in the United States by enrollment, behind the California State University system, the State University of New York (SUNY) system, and the University of California system. More than 271,000-degree-credit students, continuing, and professional education students are enrolled at campuses located in all five New York City boroughs.

The university has one of the most diverse student bodies in the United States, with students hailing from around the world, but mostly from New York City. The black, white and Hispanic undergraduate populations each comprise more than a quarter of the student body, and Asian undergraduates make up 18 percent. Fifty-eight percent are female, and 28 percent are 25 or older. In the 2017–2018 award year, 144,380 CUNY students received the Federal Pell Grant.

CUNY Citizenship Now! 
Founded in 1997 by immigration lawyer Allan Wernick, CUNY Citizenship Now! is an immigration assistance organization that provides free and confidential immigration law services to help individuals and families on their path to U.S. citizenship. In 2021, CUNY launched a College Immigrant Ambassador Program in partnership with the New York City Department of Education.

Academics

Component institutions

Management structure

The forerunner of today's City University of New York was governed by the Board of Education of New York City. Members of the Board of Education, chaired by the president of the board, served as ex officio trustees. For the next four decades, the board members continued to serve as ex officio trustees of the College of the City of New York and the city's other municipal college, the Normal College of the City of New York.

In 1900, the New York State Legislature created separate boards of trustees for the College of the City of New York and the Normal College, which became Hunter College in 1914. In 1926, the legislature established the Board of Higher Education of the City of New York, which assumed supervision of both municipal colleges.

In 1961, the New York State Legislature established the City University of New York, uniting what had become seven municipal colleges at the time: the City College of New York, Hunter College, Brooklyn College, Queens College, Staten Island Community College, Bronx Community College and Queensborough Community College. In 1979, the CUNY Financing and Governance Act was adopted by the State and the Board of Higher Education became the City University of New York Board of Trustees.

Today, the City University is governed by the board of trustees composed of 17 members, ten of whom are appointed by the governor of New York "with the advice and consent of the senate," and five by the mayor of New York City "with the advice and consent of the senate." The final two trustees are ex officio members. One is the chair of the university's student senate, and the other is non-voting and is the chair of the university's faculty senate. Both the mayoral and gubernatorial appointments to the CUNY Board are required to include at least one resident of each of New York City's five boroughs. Trustees serve seven-year terms, which are renewable for another seven years. The chancellor is elected by the Board of Trustees, and is the "chief educational and administrative officer" of the City University.

The administrative offices are in Midtown Manhattan.

Faculty
CUNY employs 6,700 full-time faculty members and over 10,000 adjunct faculty members. Faculty and staff are represented by the Professional Staff Congress (PSC), a labor union and chapter of the American Federation of Teachers.

Notable faculty

 André Aciman, writer, Graduate Center
Ali Jimale Ahmed, poet and professor of Comparative Literature, Queens College and Graduate Center
F. Murray Abraham, actor of stage and screen; professor of theater, winner of the Academy Award for Best Actor, Brooklyn College
 Chantal Akerman, film director, City College of New York
 Meena Alexander, poet and writer, Graduate Center and Hunter College
Hannah Arendt, philosopher and political theorist; author of The Origins of Totalitarianism (1951) and The Human Condition (1958), Brooklyn College
 Talal Asad, anthropologist, Graduate Center
John Ashbery, poet, Pulitzer Prize for Poetry winner, Brooklyn College
 William Bialek, biophysicist, Graduate Center
 Edwin G. Burrows, historian and writer, Pulitzer Prize for History winner for co-writing Gotham: A History of New York City to 1898 with Mike Wallace, Brooklyn College
 Ron Carter, jazz bassist, City College
 Joe Chambers, jazz drummer, City College
Dee L. Clayman, classicist, Graduate Center
Margaret Clapp, scholar, winner of the Pulitzer Prize for Biography or Autobiography, president of Wellesley College, Brooklyn College
 Ta-Nehisi Coates, writer, journalist, and activist, CUNY Graduate School of Journalism
 Billy Collins, poet, U.S. Poet Laureate, Lehman College (retired)
 Blanche Wiesen Cook, historian, John Jay College of Criminal Justice and Graduate Center
 John Corigliano, composer, Graduate Center
 Michael Cunningham, writer, winner of Pulitzer Prize for Fiction and PEN/Faulkner Award for The Hours, Brooklyn College
 Roy DeCarava, artist and photographer, Hunter College
 Carolyn Eisele, mathematician, Hunter College
 Nancy Fraser, philosopher and political scientist, Graduate Center
 Ruth Wilson Gilmore, geographer, Graduate Center
 Allen Ginsberg, beat poet, Brooklyn College
 Aaron Goodelman, sculptor
 Joel Glucksman, Olympic saber fencer, Brooklyn College
 Ralph Goldstein, Olympic épée fencer, Brooklyn College
 Michael Grossman, economist, Graduate Center
 Kimiko Hahn, poet, winner of PEN/Voelcker Award for Poetry, Queens College
 David Harvey, geographer, Graduate Center
 Jimmy Heath, jazz saxophonist, City College
 Bell Hooks, educator, writer and critic, City College of New York
Karen Brooks Hopkins, president of the Brooklyn Academy of Music, Brooklyn College
John Hospers, first presidential candidate of the US Libertarian Party, Brooklyn College
 Tyehimba Jess, poet, winner of Pulitzer Prize for Poetry, College of Staten Island
 KC Johnson born (1967), Brooklyn College and Graduate Center
 Sheila Jordan, jazz vocalist, City College
 Michio Kaku, physicist, City College
 Jane Katz, Olympian swimmer, John Jay College of Criminal Justice
 Alfred Kazin, writer and critic, Hunter College and Graduate Center
 Saul Kripke, philosopher, Graduate Center
 Irving Kristol, journalist, City College
 Paul Krugman, economist, Graduate Center
 Peter Kwong, journalist, filmmaker, activist, Hunter College and Graduate Center
 Nathan H. Lents, scientist, author, and science communicator, John Jay College of Criminal Justice
 Ben Lerner, writer, MacArthur Fellow, Brooklyn College
 Audre Lorde, poet and activist, City College, John Jay College of Criminal Justice
 Cate Marvin, poet, Guggenheim Fellowship winner, College of Staten Island
Abraham Maslow, psychologist in the school of humanistic psychology, best known for his theory of human motivation which led to a therapeutic technique known as self-actualization, Brooklyn College
 John Matteson, historian and writer, Pulitzer Prize winner, John Jay College of Criminal Justice
 Maeve Kennedy McKean, attorney and public health official
 Stanley Milgram, social psychologist, Graduate Center
 Charles W. Mills, philosopher, Graduate Center
 June Nash, anthropologist, Graduate Center
 Ruth O'Brien, political scientist and disability studies writer, Graduate Center
Denise O'Connor, Olympic foil fencer, Brooklyn College
John Patitucci, jazz bassist, City College
 Itzhak Perlman, violinist, Brooklyn College
 Frances Fox Piven, political scientist, activist, and educator, Graduate Center
Roman Popadiuk, US Ambassador to Ukraine, Brooklyn College
 Graham Priest, philosopher, Graduate Center
Inez Smith Reid, Senior Judge of the District of Columbia Court of Appeals, Brooklyn College
 Adrienne Rich, poet and activist, City College of New York
 David M. Rosenthal, philosopher, Graduate Center
Mark Rothko (born Markus Yakovlevich Rothkowitz), influential abstract expressionist painter, Brooklyn College
 Arthur M. Schlesinger Jr., historian and social critic, Graduate Center
 Flora Rheta Schreiber, journalist, John Jay College of Criminal Justice
 Eve Kosofsky Sedgwick, literary critic, Graduate Center
 Betty Shabazz, educator and activist, Medgar Evers College
Mark Strand, United States Poet Laureate, Pulitzer Prize for Poetry-winning poet, essayist, and translator, Brooklyn College
 Dennis Sullivan, mathematician, Graduate Center
 Harold Syrett (1913–1984), president of Brooklyn College
 Katherine Verdery, anthropologist, Graduate Center 
 Michele Wallace, women's studies and film studies, City College and Graduate Center
 Mike Wallace, historian and writer, John Jay College of Criminal Justice and Graduate Center
Ruth Westheimer (better known as Dr. Ruth; born Karola Ruth Siegel), sex therapist, media personality, author, radio, television talk show host, and Holocaust survivor, Brooklyn College
 Elie Wiesel, novelist, political activist, winner of the Nobel Peace Prize, Presidential Medal of Freedom, and Congressional Gold Medal, City College
C. K. Williams, poet, won Pulitzer Prize for Poetry, Brooklyn College
 Andrea Alu, engineer and physicist, Graduate Center
Robert Alfano, physicist, discovered the supercontinuum, City College
 Branko Milanović, economist most known for his work on income distribution and inequality; a visiting presidential professor at the Graduate Center of the City University of New York, an affiliated senior scholar at the Luxembourg Income Study and former lead economist in the World Bank's research department.
 Simi Linton, arts consultant, author, filmmaker, and activist. Focuses on disability in the arts, disability studies, and ways that disability rights and disability justice perspectives can be brought to bear on the arts.

Public Safety Department

CUNY has a unified public safety department, the City University of New York Public Safety Department, with branches at each of the 26 CUNY campuses.
The New York City Police Department is the primary policing and investigation agency within the New York City as per the NYC Charter, which includes all CUNY campuses and facilities.

The Public Safety Department came under heavy criticism from student groups, after several students protesting tuition increases tried to occupy the lobby of the Baruch College. The occupiers were forcibly removed from the area and several were arrested on November 21, 2011.

City University Television (CUNY TV)

CUNY also has a broadcast TV service, CUNY TV (channel 75 on Spectrum, digital HD broadcast channel 25.3), which airs telecourses, classic and foreign films, magazine shows, and panel discussions in foreign languages.

City University Film Festival (CUNYFF)
The City University Film Festival is CUNY's official film festival. The festival was founded in 2009.

Notable alumni

CUNY graduates include 13 Nobel laureates, 2 Fields Medalists, 2 U.S. Secretaries of State, a Supreme Court Justice, several New York City mayors, members of Congress, state legislators, scientists, artists, and Olympians.

See also

 City University of New York Athletic Conference
 CUNY Academic Commons
 Education in New York City
 Guide Association
 State University of New York (SUNY) system. 
 The William E. Macaualay Honors College

References

External links

 
 City University of New York in Open NY (data.ny.gov)
  
 

 
Educational institutions established in 1961
1961 establishments in New York City
Public universities and colleges in New York (state)
New York, CUNY